93 'til Infinity is the debut studio album by American hip-hop group Souls of Mischief. It was released on September 28, 1993, on the Jive label.

Composition
The sound of 93 'til Infinity is characteristic of the distinct style explored by the collective, including a rhyme scheme based on internal rhyme and beats centered around a live bass and obscure jazz and funk samples. 93 'til Infinity was released during a period in which the collective released several critically acclaimed albums (including Del tha Funkee Homosapien's No Need for Alarm and Casual's Fear Itself) and rose to national prominence.

93 'til Infinity met commercial success with its title track and lead single, which reached #72 on the Billboard Hot 100. It also featured singles "That's When Ya Lost" and "Never No More" which reached the Hot Rap Singles but never charted on The Billboard Hot 100. According to Allmusic author Steve Huey, "Although the title cut is an underappreciated classic, 93 'til Infinity makes its greatest impression through its stunning consistency, not individual highlights." Huey also goes on to remark that 93 'til Infinity is "one of the most slept-on records of the '90s".

Reception

93 'til Infinity was critically acclaimed for its subject matter, production, and rapping. Although it was not as popular as other West Coast hip hop albums at the time of its release, it received positive acclaim. Suzann Vogel of Philadelphia Weekly praised it:

Steve Huey of AllMusic also gives 93 'til Infinity much praise, calling it "the best single album to come out of Oakland's Hieroglyphics camp" as well as saying how Souls of Mischief "completely redefined the art of lyrical technique for the West Coast."

In 1998, the album was selected as one of The Sources 100 Best Rap Albums. The title track was also included on the compilation remix album Another Late Night: Zero 7, released in 2002.

Influence 
The title track "93 'til Infinity" proved to have an enduring legacy, being referenced and/or sampled in more than 40 songs to date. Some of the most notable include:

 You Never Knew (1998) - Hieroglyphics
 Lysol (2007) - Curren$y feat. Young Roddy
 A Tribute to Souls (2008) -  J. Rawls presents The Liquid Crystal Project
 How We Do (2009) - Freddie Gibbs
 'Til Infinity (2009) - J.Cole
 Infinity (2009) - Mathias Meyer
 09' Until (2009) - Tyga
 Somedayz (2010) -  Big K.R.I.T
 Infinity and Beyond (2012) -  Capital STEEZ
 95 til' Infinity (2013) - Joey Bada$$

Track listing

Charts

Weekly charts

Singles

Credits
Souls Of Mischief:
Opio - vocals
Tajai - vocals
Phesto - vocals
A-Plus – DJ, producer

Additional personnel:
Pep Love
Del the Funky Homosapien - producer
Casual – rap, vocals
Bill Ortiz  – trumpet
Domino - producer
Jay Biz - producer
Kwam
Snupe – background vocals

References

External links
 

1993 debut albums
Souls of Mischief albums
Jive Records albums
Albums produced by A-Plus (rapper)